Kevin O'Reilly is a Canadian politician, who was elected to the Legislative Assembly of the Northwest Territories in the 2015 election. He represents the electoral district of Frame Lake.

O'Reilly is the Chair of the Standing Committee on Accountability and Oversight, a Member of the Standing Committee on Economic Development and Environment, an Alternate Member of the Standing Committee on Government Operations, and a Member of the Standing Committee on Rules and Procedures of the Legislative Assembly of the Northwest Territories

References 

Living people
Members of the Legislative Assembly of the Northwest Territories
People from Yellowknife
21st-century Canadian politicians
Year of birth missing (living people)